Marine – à travers les arbres is an orchestral composition by the English composer Andrew March. It was the winning piece in the inaugural Masterprize International Composition Competition held in 1998 after having been selected from 1,318 entries from over 60 countries. The impressionistic work has been performed 13 times throughout the world.

Composition

Marine – à travers les arbres was inspired by the spectacular scenery of Moulin Huet Bay in Guernsey and two of Pierre-Auguste Renoir's paintings of the same bay in 1883; 'Baie du Moulin Huet à travers les arbres' and 'Marine à Guernsey'. In September 1996, Andrew March made sketches of what would become his symphonic “tone pictures”, but it was only when he had knowledge of the Masterprize composing competition that he was spurred on with the compositional process. The resultant piece has a duration of 11 minutes 48.

Reception

Marine – à travers les arbres received critical acclaim both during the Masterprize competition and in reviews of the gala final. After receiving the highest combined votes from members of the public and a jury of eminent classical musicians, the piece became the overall winning work. However, the new status of the piece was greeted with mixed reactions by music critics who felt that it was one of the weakest of the six competition pieces.

 

The majority of post-Masterprize reviews criticised March’s winning piece. Rob Cowan writing in The Independent in the wake of the Masterprize Final made it clear he would not have chosen the piece as the winning work:

Sara Austin writing for the Forum of the Symphony Orchestra Institute in October 1998 pointed out that:

Publishing
In 1998, Marine – à travers les arbres was published by Masterprize and sub–published by EMI Music Publishing Ltd and the piece has since been handled by the hire library of the Music Sales Group.

Recordings
Marine – à travers les arbres was first recorded in 1997 by the BBC Philharmonic Orchestra under conductor Philip Ellis for the semi-finals of the Masterprize Composing Competition.  Between 21–23 December 1997, the London Symphony Orchestra recorded the work in Studio 1, Abbey Road Studios. This recording was released as the covermount CD of the March 1998 edition of the BBC Music Magazine (BBCMM67), and the same recording was subsequently released by EMI on the Debut Series (CDZ5728262) on 6 September 1998. The covermount CD of the six finalist works was one of the competition's methods for capturing the votes of the public, enabling the magazine's worldwide readership of over 200,000 to take part.

Performances
The world première of Marine – à travers les arbres with given by the London Symphony Orchestra under Daniel Harding on Tuesday, 7 April 1998, during the Masterprize Gala Final at the Barbican Centre in London. Later in 1998, there were further performances in Zurich and Moscow with the State Tchaikovsky Symphony Orchestra under conductor, Mischa Damev. As part of the European Union Youth Orchestra (EUYO) tour of 1998, Marine – à travers les arbres received repeat performances at concerts in Düsseldorf, Gävle (Sweden) and at EXPO' 98, Lisbon. The EUYO tour culminated in September 1998 with a televised performance at The Proms under the direction of internationally renowned conductor Vladimir Ashkenazy.

Broadcasts
The first Masterprize competition reached an estimated global listenership of 100 to 150 million. As one of the finalist pieces and eventually the overall winner, Marine – a travers les arbres benefit from 250 airings across 40 international stations.

The first broadcast of Marine – a travers les arbres took place during BBC Radio 3’s Musical Encounters with Mark Rowlinson on Tuesday, 4 November 1997. The broadcast used the first recording made under the auspices of the European Broadcasting Union for the semifinals, and featured the BBC Philharmonic with conductor Philip Ellis.

The interest of radio stations has continued well beyond the immediate fallout of Masterprize with airplay in 2004 on WNYC-FM (New York Public Radio) and Concertzender Netherlands. In August 2005, the piece featured on Rádio e Televisão de Portugal (RTP2) as part of the series "A Geografia dos Sons" and in August 2006 and April 2007 there were broadcasts on Brazil's Rádio Cultura programme "A Seguir Harmonia" (Ask The Maestro) with João Mauricio Galindo. In November 2015, Marine – a travers les arbres was aired during the Full Works Programme on Classic FM (South Africa).

See also
Sanguis Venenatus (elegy for strings)

References

External links
 YouTube, Marine – à travers les arbres (EUYO/Ashkenazy)
 Soundcloud, Marine – à travers les arbres (BBC Philharmonic/Ellis)
 Soundcloud, Marine – à travers les arbres (London Symphony Orchestra/Harding)
 Marine – à travers les arbres British Music Collection (BMIC)
 Marine – à travers les arbres Royal College of Music (RCM) Library Catalogue
 Marine – à travers les arbres British Library (Sound & Moving Image Catalogue) 

Compositions by Andrew March
Compositions for symphony orchestra
1997 compositions